Anna Tonelli, née Anna Nistri ( – 1846) was an Italian portrait painter, active in the late 18th century and early 19th century primarily in Florence and London. She often worked on miniature painting, watercolors, and pastels.

Biography 

 
Anna Nistri was born circa 1763 in Florence, Italy. In 1785, she married Italian violinist and composer, :it:Luigi Tonelli and together they had two children. It is thought she received training in fine art from Giuseppe Piattoli in Florence. 

Early in her career she painted portraits of Henry Blundell and Edward Clive, Earl of Powis. From 1794, she lived in London, where she taught the Clive's children in drawing and exhibited twice at the Royal Academy of Arts in 1794 and 1797. From 1798 to 1801, she accompanied the Clive family a trip to India, where she worked primarily in watercolors. After the trip to India she returned to Italy to be with her family.

Her work is included in public museum collections including the British Museum, the Holburne Museum, National Gallery of Art, among others.

References 

1763 births
1846 deaths
Painters from Florence
18th-century Italian women artists
Italian portrait painters
19th-century Italian women artists
Italian women painters